Diana Muriel Warnock  (née Robinson; born 3 October 1940 in Western Australia) is a former Western Australian radio broadcaster, women's rights activist and state politician.

Warnock worked as a journalist with the Perth Daily News, and as a radio broadcaster with 720 ABC Perth, 6PR and 6NR.

She was elected to the State Parliament as the Member for Perth in 1993, succeeding Dr Ian Alexander who had retired.  She was re-elected in 1996 but did not contest the February 2001 election.  Her political career was entirely from the opposition bench, during the premiership of Richard Court.  Warnock served as Opposition whip, spokesperson for Multicultural and Ethnic Affairs and the Arts and spokesperson for Women's Interests and Racing & Gaming.  She also served as President of the State Parliamentary Labor Party.

In 1996, Warnock and upper house MP Cheryl Davenport steered a controversial pro-choice bill through the parliament—the "Acts Amendment (Abortion) Bill", which effectively decriminalised abortion and enabled women to access abortions of pregnancies up to 20 weeks on the basis of informed consent.

In 1999 she was named the Australian Humanist of the Year by the Council of Australian Humanist Societies.  , she is the current patron of the Friends of Perth International Arts Festival.

Warnock was married to local novelist, playwright and arts patron Bill Warnock, who died in 2001.

References

1940 births
Living people
People from Perth, Western Australia
Members of the Western Australian Legislative Assembly
Australian radio personalities
Australian women radio presenters
Recipients of the Medal of the Order of Australia
Australian Labor Party members of the Parliament of Western Australia
21st-century Australian politicians
Women members of the Western Australian Legislative Assembly
21st-century Australian women politicians